Cleveland City Schools may refer to:

Cleveland City Schools, in Cleveland, Tennessee
East Cleveland City Schools, in East Cleveland, Ohio
Cleveland Metropolitan School District, in Cleveland, Ohio
Cleveland School District, in Cleveland, Mississippi

See also
 Cleveland School (disambiguation)